Shame, Shame is the sixth album by psychedelic rock band Dr. Dog. It was released on April 6, 2010.  It was the band's first release on the ANTI- record label after moving from Park the Van.

Album information
The band hoped to more accurately recreate the energy of their live shows on the album. "We were taking those experience on stage as reference points, rather than shedding them when we go into the studio, which is what we would always do," co-frontman Scott McMicken said. “We chose a batch of songs that are a little darker, or a little bit more heart-on-your-sleeve kind of stuff.”

The album also contains the most emotional lyrical content of the band's career. On Dr. Dog's website, McMicken said of the song "Jackie Wants a Black Eye": “It’s one of the most literal songs that I’ve ever written, and it was important for me because I had been in a bad state for awhile." Toby Leaman, the other frontman, also claims that "Station" is the only song he has ever written about touring and "leaving over and over again." McMicken wrote "Shadow People" in his West Philadelphia apartment. He described the song as a "full-on West Philly diary."

Many of the songs have been in the works for years. In an interview with ACRN.com, McMicken said that "Station" and "Unbearable Why" had been originally recorded for other albums, and "Where'd All the Time Go?" is actually eight years old.  "Where'd All the Time Go?" received considerable internet attention  throughout the 2010s, as well as "Shadow People", becoming popular among indie band enthusiasts online.

Track listing

iTunes/Deluxe Download bonus tracks

Personnel
Dr. Dog is:
 Toby Leaman – bass, vocals
 Scott McMicken – lead guitar, vocals, mellotron, banjo
 Frank McElroy – rhythm guitar, vocals
 Zach Miller – keyboards, piano, mellotron, air organ
 Juston Stens – drums, percussion, vocals, mellotron (left in 2009, replaced by Eric Slick)
 Eric Slick – drums, percussion on bonus tracks

References

External links
Dr. Dog, "Shame Shame" by Billboard

2010 albums
Dr. Dog albums